Steven Smidt (born 12 November 1989) is a New Zealand cricketer. He played in six first-class and three List A matches for Central Districts from 2011 to 2015.

See also
 List of Central Districts representative cricketers

References

External links
 

1989 births
Living people
New Zealand cricketers
Central Districts cricketers
Cricketers from Napier, New Zealand